Saint-Mayme-de-Péreyrol (before 2020: Saint-Maime-de-Péreyrol) is a commune in the Dordogne department in Nouvelle-Aquitaine in southwestern France.

Population

See also
Communes of the Dordogne department

References

Communes of Dordogne